Cribrarula is a genus of sea snails, marine gastropod mollusks in the family Cypraeidae, the cowries.

Species
Species within the genus Cribrarula include:
 Cribrarula abaliena Lorenz, 1989
Cribrarula angelae Moretzsohn & Beals, 2009
 Cribrarula astaryi Schilder, 1971
 Cribrarula boninensis Simone & Takashigue, 2016
Cribrarula catholicorum Schilder & Schilder, 1938
 Cribrarula compta (Pease, 1860)
Cribrarula cribraria Linnaeus, 1758
Cribrarula cumingii (Sowerby I, 1832)
Cribrarula esontropia (Duclos, 1833)
Cribrarula exmouthensis (Melvill, 1888)
Cribrarula fallax (E.A. Smith, 1881)
Cribrarula garciai Lorenz & Raines, 2001
Cribrarula gaskoini (Reeve, 1846)
 Cribrarula gaspardi Biraghi & Nicolay, 1993
Cribrarula gravida Moretzsohn, 2002
 Cribrarula lefaiti Martin & Poppe, 1989
 Cribrarula melwardi (Iredale, 1930)
Cribrarula pellisserpentis Lorenz, 1999
Cribrarula taitae (Burgess, 1993)

Species brought into synonymy
Cribrarula cribellum (Gaskoin, 1849): synonym of Cribrarula esontropia cribellum (Gaskoin, 1849)
Cribrarula gaskoinii (Reeve, 1846): synonym of Cribrarula gaskoini (Reeve, 1846)
Cribrarula toliaraensis Bozzetti, 2007 (species inquirenda, Further research needed, including molecular data, to confirm it as a valid subspecies; it is likely a synonym of C. cribraria comma)

References

External links
 Jousseaume, F. (1884). Division des Cypraeidae. Le Naturaliste. 6(52): 414-415
 Iredale, T. (1930). Queensland molluscan notes, No. 2. Memoirs of the Queensland Museum. 10(1): 73-88, pl. 9
 Heiman E.L. 2010. The genus Cribrarula in the Indo-Pacific. Triton, 21, suppl. 2: 1-12

Cypraeidae
Gastropod genera